Nicholas James Sterling (born July 18, 1990) is an American guitar player and songwriter from Mesa, Arizona. He started learning guitar at the age of 7 years old; by the age of 10, he had released his first CD, Ten. At age 10, he shared a stage with Alice Cooper at a New Year's Eve concert. When he was 13, guitarist Dave Mason expressed admiration for his talent. In 2005 he released his second CD, Life Goes On. Sterling played all the instruments, did the vocals and recorded both CDs himself. His third album Invisible was released in 2010.

Sterling has played with quite a few famous rock musicians and bands, including Aerosmith, Kid Rock, Cheap Trick, Cinderella, Steve Vai, Joe Satriani, Eric Johnson, Gary Hoey, Peter Frampton, Gavin Degraw, Bachman–Turner Overdrive, Jackyl, Sebastian Bach, and Guns N' Roses.

Since 2008, he has been a columnist for Modern Guitars Magazine.

On October 12, 2009, Sebastian Bach announced that after a long search he had chosen Sterling to be his new guitar player. Sterling joined Bach on stage for the first time in Helsinki, Finland, on December 12, 2009 when they opened for Alice Cooper.

On August 13, 2012, Sterling was fired from Bach's band after refusing to sign a release to perform with Bach on AXS TV.

Sterling is currently the lead guitarist in the Phoenix, AZ based band, WYVES. He has a daughter with his fiancé Cyreena.

Solo

 Ten (2000) (Desert Dog)
 Life Goes On... (2005) (Desert Dog)
 Invisible (2010) (Desert Dog)

Sebastian Bach

 Kicking & Screaming (2011) (Frontier Records)

References

External links
 Nick Sterling at MySpace
 Promo Footage of the Nick Sterling documentary by Simon Barron when Nick was 13

American rock musicians
Musicians from Mesa, Arizona
Living people
1990 births
Songwriters from Arizona